Paradise Bird is a studio album by Amii Stewart released in September 1979. The album yielded two European single releases, "Jealousy" (#58 UK, #4 Italy, #5 Switzerland) and double A-side "The Letter" / "Paradise Bird" (#39 UK 1980). The album was not as successful in the USA.

The original Paradise Bird album in its entirety remains officially unreleased on compact disc. However, a semi-official release was issued in Russia in 1999 on AS4000. This release paired this album with the debut release Knock on Wood and one bonus track "My Guy, My Girl", and includes all original artwork.

Track listing
All Songs written by Barry Leng, Simon May and Gerry Morris, except where noted

Side A:
"The Letter" (Wayne Carson Thompson) - 6:58 
"Paradise Bird" - 6:35 
"He's a Burglar" (Jerry Ragovoy) - 4:50

Side B: 
"Jealousy" - 6:36 
"Right Place, Wrong Time" - 5:07 
"Step Into the Love Line" (Leng, May) - 5:23 
"Paradise Found" - 2:26

Personnel
 Amii Stewart - vocals
 Gerry Morris - bass
 Adrian Sheppard - drums
 Alan Murphy, Barry Leng - guitar
 Pete Arnesen - keyboards
 Ken Freeman - synthesizer, brass arrangements
 Ron Asprey - saxophone
 Glyn Thomas - percussion
 Jimmy Chambers, Charles Augins, Amii Stewart, Barry Leng - background vocals
 Ian Hughes - string arrangements

Charts

Production
 Barry Leng - producer

References

1979 albums
Amii Stewart albums
Hansa Records albums